We Need to Talk About Kevin is a 2011 psychological thriller drama film directed by Lynne Ramsay from a screenplay she co-wrote with Rory Stewart Kinnear, based on the 2003 novel of the same name by Lionel Shriver. A long process of development and financing began in 2005, with filming commencing in April 2010.

Tilda Swinton stars as the mother of Kevin, struggling to come to terms with her psychopathic son and the horrors he has committed. The film premiered at the 2011 Cannes Film Festival and was released in the United Kingdom on 21 October 2011.

Swinton was nominated for the Golden Globe Award, Screen Actors Guild Award, and the BAFTA for Best Actress in a Leading Role. It received generally positive reviews from critics.

Plot
Eva Khatchadourian, once a successful travel writer, lives alone in a rundown house and works in a travel agency near a prison, where she visits her son Kevin. She reflects upon her memories of raising him as she tries to cope with the hostility of her neighbors.

A reluctant mother, Eva views Kevin as detached and difficult from childhood. He appears to loathe and deliberately antagonize Eva, who struggles to bond with him. As a baby, he cries incessantly, but only around her; as a child, he resists toilet training, rebuffs Eva's attempts at affection, and shows no interest in anything. He behaves like a happy, loving son in front of his father Franklin, who dismisses Eva's concerns and makes excuses for Kevin's behavior. One day, Eva's frustration with Kevin drives her to throw him against the wall, breaking his arm. Kevin tells Franklin he fell and uses the incident to manipulate Eva, threatening to tell Franklin the truth if she does not do things he wants.

When Kevin is confined to bed with a fever, Kevin shows affection towards Eva for the first time as she reads him Robin Hood, though his spiteful personality returns as soon as he recovers. Franklin gives him a bow and arrow and teaches him archery.

Sometime later, Eva gives birth to her and Franklin's second child Celia, a lively and cheerful girl whom Kevin is instantly disdainful towards. A few years later, Celia's pet guinea pig mysteriously goes missing. Eva finds its remains in the garbage disposal the next day, which she unclogs with drain cleaner. Celia is blinded in one eye after being exposed to the cleaner while Kevin was tasked with watching her, requiring her to wear a glass eye in its place. Eva suspects Kevin injured his sister on purpose, but Franklin defends him. Tired of Eva's distrust of their son, Franklin discusses divorce with her, and Kevin overhears their conversation.

Three days before his 16th birthday, Kevin uses bicycle locks to trap several students in the school gymnasium and murder them with his bow and arrows. After witnessing Kevin’s arrest and the bodies of his victims being carried away, Eva returns home to discover that Kevin has murdered Franklin and Celia as well.

On the second anniversary of the massacre, Eva visits Kevin in prison; his demeanor has changed to demure and frightened in his anticipation of being transferred to an adult prison. Eva finally asks him why he committed the murders. Kevin responds that he used to think he knew but is no longer sure. Eva gives Kevin a warm embrace before leaving.

Cast
 Tilda Swinton as Eva Khatchadourian
 John C. Reilly as Franklin Plaskett
 Ezra Miller as Kevin Khatchadourian
 Jasper Newell as young Kevin
 Rocky Duer as infant Kevin
 Ashley Gerasimovich as Celia Khatchadourian
 Siobhan Fallon Hogan as Wanda
 Alex Manette as Colin

Production

In 2005 BBC Films acquired the rights to adapt the book as a film. Executive producers Paula Jalfon and Christine Langan took it through the development stage, and were joined by executive producer Steven Soderbergh.

Lynne Ramsay, who became available after her involvement in the film adaptation of The Lovely Bones came to an end, signed on to direct, and was working on a script with In the Bedroom writer Robert Festinger by 2006. Shriver was offered a consultative role in the production process but declined, stating she had "had it up to [her] eyeballs with that book," though she did express concern for how the film would capture Eva's role as the unreliable narrator. Production had not begun by 2007, though BBC Films renewed the adaptation rights early in the year. In an interview with The Herald in September 2007, Shriver stated that she had not been in contact with Ramsay about the film for over two years. Ramsay's spokesperson told the newspaper that a new script draft was being prepared and, at the time the interview was published, had not been submitted to the producers. Michael Clayton producer Jennifer Fox joined the production team in 2008; the film was expected to begin shooting that year. The script appeared on the 2008 Brit List, a film-industry-compiled list of the best unproduced screenplays in British film. Ramsay's partner Rory Stewart Kinnear also contributed to the final shooting script.

Christine Langan told the London Evening Standard in February 2010 that the long delay in production had been caused by BBC Films having difficulty funding the high budget; Ramsay rewrote the script so the film could be made for a lower cost. The UK Film Council awarded £18,510 to the production from its development fund in the same month. Financial backing was also provided by Footprint Investments LLP, Caemhan Partnership LLP and Lipsync Productions, and production is in association with Artina Films and Forward Films.

Filming commenced on 19 April 2010 on location in Stamford, Connecticut, and concluded on 28 May 2010. A key filming location was J.M. Wright Technical High School in Stamford.

Jonny Greenwood of the band Radiohead composed the film's score.

Release
In October 2009, Independent Film Company picked up the rights to international sales, and made pre-sales at the American Film Market. The film premiered In Competition at the 2011 Cannes Film Festival, where it was met with praise from film critics.

Artificial Eye distributed the film in the United Kingdom from 21 October 2011 and Oscilloscope Laboratories distributed the film theatrically in North America in the winter of 2011. We Need to Talk About Kevin opened in a limited release in North America in a single theater and grossed $24,587, ranking 53rd at the box office. The film ended up earning $1,738,692 in America, and $5,754,934 internationally, for a total of $7,493,626.

We Need to Talk About Kevin was released on Blu-ray and DVD on 29 May 2012.

Reception

Critical response
We Need to Talk About Kevin received positive reviews. The website's critical consensus reads, "We Need to Talk About Kevin is a masterful blend of drama and horror, with fantastic performances across the board (Tilda Swinton especially, delivering one of her very best)." On Metacritic, the film has a score of 68 out of 100 based on reviews from 37 critics, indicating "generally favorable reviews."

Chicago Sun-Times critic Roger Ebert gave the film 4 out of 4 stars and wrote, "As a portrait of a deteriorating state of mind, We Need to Talk About Kevin is a masterful film." British film critic Mark Kermode of BBC Radio 5 Live named We Need to Talk About Kevin as the Best Film of 2011 and as the second best film of the 2010s. Richard Brody wrote in The New Yorker that We Need to Talk About Kevin "masquerades as a psychological puzzle but is essentially a horror film full of decorous sensationalism." He opined that the film exploited but did not explore the fascination that "bad seed" children exert. Jake Martin, a Jesuit priest and movie critic, wrote in his review in Busted Halo that the film is "[not] yet another installment in the pantheon of post-modern films intent upon assaulting the human desire to give meaning to the world." Instead, he says, "We Need to Talk About Kevin in fact needs to be talked about, as what it is attempting to do by marrying the darkest, most nihilistic components of contemporary cinema with a redemptive message is groundbreaking."

Accolades
Tilda Swinton was nominated for a number of acting awards, including a Golden Globe Award, Screen Actors Guild and BAFTA for Best Actress in a leading role.'

References

External links
 
 
 
 

2011 films
2011 independent films
2011 psychological thriller films
2011 thriller drama films
2010s psychological drama films
American independent films
American psychological drama films
American psychological thriller films
American thriller drama films
Best Film, London Film Festival winners
British independent films
British psychological drama films
British psychological thriller films
British thriller drama films
Films about dysfunctional families
Films about mass murder
Films about school violence
Films based on American novels
Films directed by Lynne Ramsay
Films scored by Jonny Greenwood
Films set in Connecticut
Films shot in Connecticut
Patricide in fiction
Sororicide in fiction
Films about mother–son relationships
Postmodern films
2010s English-language films
2010s American films
2010s British films